Byasa hedistus is a species of butterfly from the family Papilionidae (swallowtails) that is found in northern Vietnam and southern China.

Byasa hedistus is little known, with no information available on status. it is regarded by Bernard d'Abrera as a subspecies of Byasa dasarada.

References

Jordan, K.,1928 On the latreillei group of eastern Papilios. Novitates Zoologicae. 34:159-172, pl.6,7. online as pdf

External links
External image (figure 5)

Butterflies described in 1928
Byasa